Helen Clifton (née Ashman) (4 May 1948 – 14 June 2011) was a British Salvation Army Commissioner. She spent her childhood in London, connected to the Edmonton Corps of The Salvation Army. She was a teacher before entering the International Training College at Denmark Hill, London, to become a full-time Officer of The Salvation Army. She married the now retired General of The Salvation Army, Shaw Clifton, in 1967.

She held a Bachelor of Arts (Honours) degree in English language and literature from Westfield College, University of London and a Post-Graduate Certificate of Education from Goldsmiths’ College, University of London.

External links
The Salvation Army international homepage 
General Shaw Clifton and Commissioner Helen Clifton 
Welcome and Dedication Meeting General Shaw Clifton and Commissioner Helen Clifton
Cliftons elected to lead 
Commissioner speaks out against trafficking 
Death notice of Commissioner Helen Clifton 

Salvation Army officers
English Salvationists
Alumni of Westfield College
Alumni of Goldsmiths, University of London
1948 births
2011 deaths
Commissioners in The Salvation Army